Ihor Serhiyovych Snurnitsyn (born 7 March 2000) is a Ukrainian football player who plays for Zorya Luhansk.

Club career
He made his Ukrainian Premier League debut for FC Olimpik Donetsk on 15 April 2018 in a game against FC Oleksandriya.

International
He represented Ukraine at the 2017 UEFA European Under-17 Championship, Ukraine did not advance from the group stage.

He also appeared in one group-stage game at the 2018 UEFA European Under-19 Championship as Ukraine reached the semifinals. On June 15, 2019 Snurnitsyn won the FIFA U-20 World Cup, being in the squad of Ukraine national U-20 team.

Honours

International

Ukraine U20
FIFA U-20 World Cup: 2019

References

External links
 

2000 births
People from Dokuchaievsk
Living people
Ukrainian footballers
Ukraine youth international footballers
Ukraine under-21 international footballers
Association football defenders
FC Olimpik Donetsk players
FC Zorya Luhansk players
Ukrainian Premier League players
Sportspeople from Donetsk Oblast